John Frederick Mann Lindemann (June 5, 1881 – December 19, 1951) was an American Major League Baseball outfielder. He played for the Philadelphia Athletics during the  season.

References

Major League Baseball outfielders
Philadelphia Athletics players
Baseball players from Pennsylvania
1881 births
1951 deaths
Williamsport Millionaires players
New Castle Outlaws players
Marion Moguls players
East Liverpool (minor league baseball) players